Yerson Gutiérrez Cuenca (born 20 January 1994) is a Colombian footballer who currently plays as a forward for Marathón.

Career statistics

Club

Notes

References

1991 births
Living people
Colombian footballers
Colombia youth international footballers
Colombian expatriate footballers
Association football defenders
Academia F.C. players
Godoy Cruz Antonio Tomba footballers
Tianjin Tianhai F.C. players
FBC Melgar footballers
Platense F.C. players
Gudja United F.C. players
Categoría Primera B players
China League One players
Peruvian Primera División players
Liga Nacional de Fútbol Profesional de Honduras players
Maltese Premier League players
Colombian expatriate sportspeople in Argentina
Expatriate footballers in Argentina
Colombian expatriate sportspeople in China
Expatriate footballers in China
Colombian expatriate sportspeople in Peru
Expatriate footballers in Peru
Colombian expatriate sportspeople in Honduras
Expatriate footballers in Honduras
Colombian expatriate sportspeople in Malta
Expatriate footballers in Malta
People from Villavicencio